= Nachte Raho =

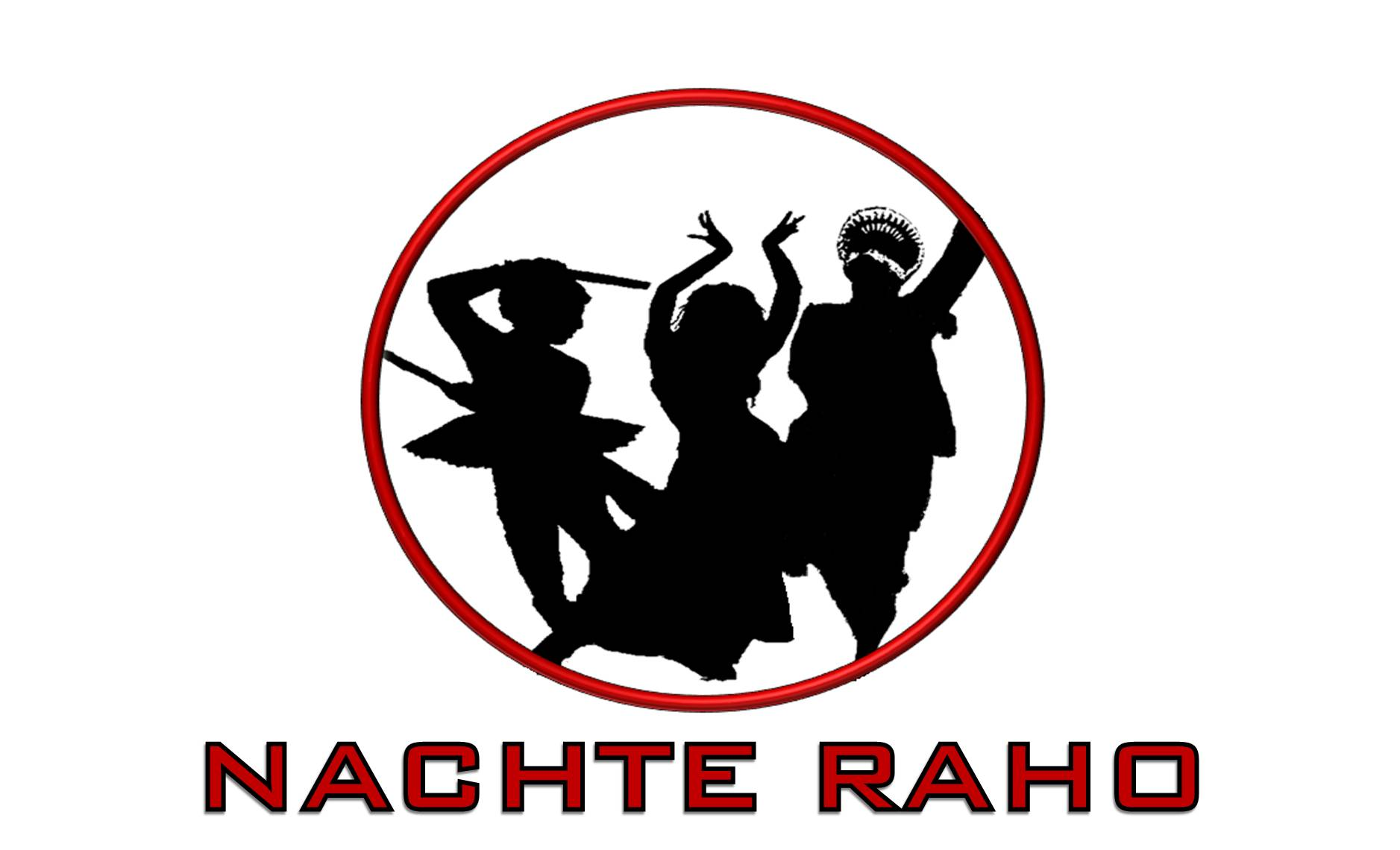
Nachte Raho Logo

Nachte Raho is a South-Asian dance competition which started out in 2003 as a small competition hosted by the University of Iowa's Indian Student Alliance. It has since changed into one of the largest dance competitions in the Midwest and features the top teams from all across the country.

== 2010 Competition Teams ==
=== Fusion ===
- University of Illinois at Urbana-Champaign – Fizaa
- Northwestern University – Mirch Masala
- University of Illinois at Chicago – Dhamaal

=== Raas ===
- University of Chicago – Chicago Raas
- University of Illinois at Chicago – DangeRaas

=== Bhangra ===
- Emory University – Karma Bhangra
- Northwestern University – Northwestern Bhangra
- St. Louis University – SLU Bhangra

From 2003 - 2007 Nachte Raho was held at the University of Iowa, Iowa Memorial Union. Due to the increasing success and popularity of the competition, a larger venue was needed. It was held at Hancher Auditorium in 2008. Due to campus wide catastrophic flooding, Nachte Raho returned to the Iowa Memorial Union in 2009 and will be held there until Hancher reopens or a new facility is built.

The top teams are chosen from a wide range of qualified applicants to come to the University of Iowa in Iowa City and perform a five- to ten-minute dance routine. Participating teams perform one of three popular styles of Indian dance: Garba-Raas, Bhangra, and Fusion.

There will be a new format for this year's competition. 3 teams from each category will be invited to Nachte Raho. There will be one winner from each category and an overall grand prize winner. $5,000 in total prize money are given out to the top three teams. The winner of each category will receive $1,000 and the overall grand prize winner will receive $2,500 for a total of $3,500.

== Past winners ==
2003:

1. UIC (1st Place)

2. Bradley University (2nd Place)

3. Southwest Missouri State

4. Iowa State University

2004: $1750 Total Prize Money

1. D-Squad - Drake University (1st Place)

2. Dhamaal - University of Illinois, Chicago (2nd Place)

3. Sapnon Ki Soniya - Ohio State University (3rd Place)

4. Bradley University

5. Pirates of the Pind - Benedictine University

6. Dance 2XS - Purdue University

7. The South Asian Association - Depaul University

2005: $1500 Total Prize Money

1. Dhamaal - University of Illinois, Chicago (1st Place)

2. Ghunghroo - University of Illinois, Urbana-Champaign (2nd Place)

3. Shera de Tor Punjabi - Benedictine University (3rd Place)

4. Exhibition: Noopor Dance Troupe

2006: $2500 Total Prize Money

1. Benedictine Bhangra - Benedictine University (1st Place)

2. Dhamaal - University of Illinois, Chicago (2nd Place)

3. Taal - University of Michigan

4. Mizzou Mirchi - University of Missouri

5. Balle Bhangra - University of Chicago

6. Fusion - Iowa State University

2007: $5000 Total Prize Money

1. Northwestern University Bhangra (1st Place)

2. Northwestern University Raas (2nd Place)

3. Dhamaal - University of Illinois, Chicago (3rd Place)

4. Brick City Bhangra

5. SMU Raas

6. Ghungroo - University of Illinois, Urbana-Champaign

7. RPI Raas

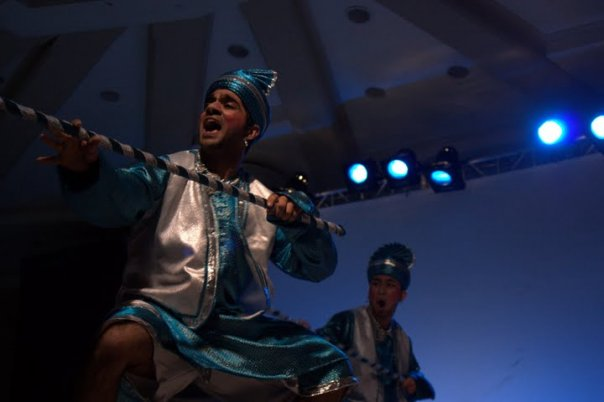
SLU Bhangra Nachte Raho 2009

2008: $5000 Total Prize Money

1. Northwestern University Raas (1st Place)

2. Northwestern University Bhangra (2nd Place)

3. SLU - Bhangra Begins (3rd Place)

4. Deeva Dance Troupe

5. Raas Man Group

6. Junoon

7. University of Illinois, Chicago - Dhamaal

8. Dhoom

2009: $5000 Total Prize Money

1. Northwestern Bhangra (1st Place)

2. Mirch Masala – Northwestern University (2nd Place)

3. St. Louis University – Bhangra – St. Louis University (3rd Place)

4. A-NU-Bhav – Northwestern University

5. Balle Bhangra – University of Chicago

6. Raqqas – Virginia Commonwealth University

7. Dhamaal - University of Illinois, Chicago

8. Bhangra – Washington University

2010: $5000 Total Prize Money

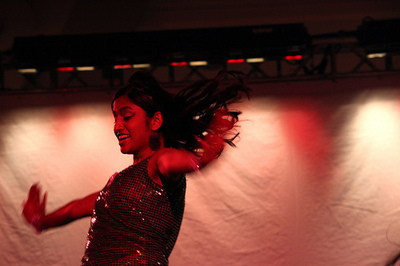
Nachte Raho 2010

1. Chicago Raas - University of Chicago (1st Place)

2. DangeRaas - University of Illinois at Chicago (2nd Place)

3. Northwestern Bhangra - Northwestern University (3rd Place)

4. Mirch Masala - Northwestern University

5. Fizaa - University of Illinois at Urbana-Champaign

6. Dhamaal - University of Illinois at Chicago

7. Karma Bhangra - Emory University

8. SLU Bhangra - St. Louis University

9. Iowa Andhi - University of Iowa (Exhibition Act)

== Dance Styles ==
Nachte Raho 2016 will be hosting eight teams to compete for a total of $5,000 in prize money. The 2016 Nachte Raho will also be a Bollywood America Bid Point Competition. The competitors of Nachte Raho will be awarded points towards being a bid to Bollywood America 2016 on 9 April 2016 in Cleveland, OH.
